Hipparchia neomiris, the Corsican grayling, is a butterfly in the family Nymphalidae.
It is an endemic species confined to the islands of Corsica (where it is widespread and common in
mountainous regions), Sardinia and Elba. The Corsican grayling flies in July.

The larvae feed on Poaceae.

Description

References

Hipparchia (Hipparchia) neomiris (Godart, 1822) at Moths and Butterflies of Europe and North Africa

Hipparchia (butterfly)
Butterflies described in 1822
Butterflies of Europe
Taxa named by Jean-Baptiste Godart